Sofiane Selmouni (born 22 September 1989 in Oran) is an Algerian-born French middle-distance runner. He finished sixth at the 2017 European Indoor Championships.

International competitions

Personal bests
Outdoor
400 metres – 49.21 (Mulhouse 2013)
600 metres – 1:23.29 (Illzach 2011)
800 metres – 1:45.94 (Montreuil-sous-Bois 2014)
1000 metres – 2:21.44 (Schifflange 2012)
1500 metres – 3:40.01 (Brussels 2015)
Indoor
800 metres – 1:53.80 (Metz 2012)
1000 metres – 2:21.98 (Metz 2015)
1500 metres – 3:39.88 (Karlsruhe 2017)

References

All-Athletics profile

1989 births
Living people
French male middle-distance runners
French sportspeople of Algerian descent
Sportspeople from Oran